Beliehouma is a village in the Nzérékoré Prefecture in the Nzérékoré Region of south-eastern Guinea.
It is located northeast of Nzérékoré and the N1 road running from the regional city passes through the village.

External links
Satellite map at Maplandia

Populated places in the Nzérékoré Region